Whitecraig is a village in East Lothian, Scotland. It lies between Musselburgh and Dalkeith, to the east of the city of Edinburgh.

References

External links

Canmore - Dalkeith Colliery site record

Villages in East Lothian
Musselburgh